The 1926 Darlington by-election was a by-election held on 17 February 1926 for the British House of Commons constituency of Darlington in County Durham.

Vacancy 
The seat had become vacant when the sitting Conservative Member of Parliament (MP), William Pease had died on 23 January 1926, aged 60. He had held the seat since a by-election in 1923.

Candidates 
The Liberal Party candidate was 51-year-old John Dickie, who had been the MP for Gateshead from 1923 until his defeat at the  1924 general election.

The Labour Party candidate was 42-year-old Arthur Shepherd, and E. H. Pease stood for the Conservatives.  Pease had not previously contested a parliamentary election, but Shepherd had contested Darlington in 1924, losing by over 2000 votes to William Pease.

Result 
On a slightly increased turnout, the result was a narrow victory for Shepherd. His share of the vote was lower than in 1924, when there had been no Liberal candidate, but the presence of a Liberal in the by-election impacted more heavily on the Conservatives than on Labour.

Aftermath 
Shepherd held the seat at the 1929 general election, but was defeated in 1931.

Pease did not stand for Parliament again, but Dickie was elected in 1931 as National Liberal MP for Consett.

Votes

See also
Darlington constituency
Darlington
1923 Darlington by-election
1983 Darlington by-election
List of United Kingdom by-elections (1918–1931)

Sources 

1926 elections in the United Kingdom
1926 in England
20th century in County Durham
Politics of Darlington
By-elections to the Parliament of the United Kingdom in County Durham constituencies